This is a list of the top-level leaders for religious groups with at least 50,000 adherents, and that led anytime from January 1, 1301, to December 31, 1400. It should likewise only name leaders listed on other articles and lists.

Christianity

Catholicism
Roman Catholic Church (complete list) –
Boniface VIII, Pope (1294–1303)
Benedict XI, Pope (1303–1304)
Clement V, Pope (1305–1314)
John XXII, Pope (1316–1334)
Benedict XII, Pope (1334–1342)
Clement VI, Pope (1342–1352)
Innocent VI, Pope (1352–1362)
Urban V, Pope (1362–1370)
Gregory XI, Pope (1370–1378)
Urban VI, Pope (1378–1389)
Boniface IX, Pope (1389–1404)

Eastern Orthodoxy
Church of Constantinople – (complete list), the first among equals in Eastern Orthodoxy
John XII, Ecumenical Patriarch of Constantinople (1294–1303)
Athanasius I, Ecumenical Patriarch of Constantinople (1289–1293, 1303–1310)
Nephon I, Ecumenical Patriarch of Constantinople (1310–1314)
John XIII Glykys, Ecumenical Patriarch of Constantinople (1315–1320)
Gerasimos I, Ecumenical Patriarch of Constantinople (1320–1321)
Isaias, Ecumenical Patriarch of Constantinople (1323–1334)
John XIV Kalekas, Ecumenical Patriarch of Constantinople (1334–1347)
Isidore I, Ecumenical Patriarch of Constantinople (1347–1350)
Callistus I, Ecumenical Patriarch of Constantinople (1350–1354, 1355–1363)
Philotheus Kokkinos, Ecumenical Patriarch of Constantinople (1354–1355, 1364–1376)
Callistus I, Ecumenical Patriarch of Constantinople (1350–1354, 1355–1363)
Philotheus Kokkinos, Ecumenical Patriarch of Constantinople (1354–1355, 1364–1376)
Macarius, Ecumenical Patriarch of Constantinople (1376–1379, 1390–1391)
Nilus Kerameus, Ecumenical Patriarch of Constantinople (1379–1388)
Antony IV, Ecumenical Patriarch of Constantinople (1389–1390, 1391–1397)
Macarius, Ecumenical Patriarch of Constantinople (1376–1379, 1390–1391)
Antony IV, Ecumenical Patriarch of Constantinople (1389–1390, 1391–1397)
Callistus II Xanthopoulos, Ecumenical Patriarch of Constantinople (1397)
Matthew I, Ecumenical Patriarch of Constantinople (1397–1410)

Oriental Orthodoxy
Ethiopian Church, (complete list) -
 Yohannes ( 14th century)
 Yaqob ( 1337–1344)
 vacant (1344–1348)
 Salama II (1348–1388)
 Bartalomewos (1398/9–1436)

Islam

Sunni

Abbasid Caliphate, Cairo (complete list) –
al-Hakim I, Caliph (1262–1302)
al-Mustakfi I, Caliph (1303–1340)
al-Wathiq I, Caliph (1340–1341)
al-Hakim II, Caliph (1341–1352)
al-Mu'tadid I, Caliph (1352–1362)
al-Mutawakkil I, Caliph (1362–1377, 1377–1383, 1389–1406)
al-Musta'sim, Caliph (1377, 1386–1389)
al-Wathiq II, Caliph (1383–1386)

Shia
Twelver Islam
Imams (complete list) –
Muhammad al-Mahdi, Imam (874–present) Shia belief holds that he was hidden by Allah in 874.

Isma'ili
Nizari Isma'ilism (complete list) –
Shams al-Din Muhammad, Imam (1257–1310)
Qasim-Shahi line:
Qasim Shah, Imam
Islam Shah, Imam 
Muhammad ibn Islam Shah, Imam 
Muhammad-Shahi line:
Ala al-Din Mu'min Shah ibn Muhammad
Muhammad Shah ibn Mu'min Shah
Radhi al-Din ibn Muhammad Shah

Tayyibi Isma'ilism (complete list) –
Ibrahim ibn al-Husayn, Da'i al-Mutlaq (1287–1328)
Muhammad ibn Hatim, Da'i al-Mutlaq (1328–1329)
Ali Shams al-Din I, Da'i al-Mutlaq (1329–1345)
Abd al-Muttalib, Da'i al-Mutlaq (1345–1354)
Abbas ibn Muhammad, Da'i al-Mutlaq (1354–1377)
Abdallah Fakhr al-Din, Da'i al-Mutlaq (1377–1407)

Zaydi
Zaydi imams of Yemen (complete list) –
al-Mahdi Muhammad bin al-Mutahhar, Imam (1301–1328)
al-Mu'ayyad Yahya, Imam (1328–1346)
an-Nasir Ali bin Salah, Imam (1328–1329)
Ahmad bin Ali al-Fathi, Imam (1329–1349)
al-Wathiq al-Mutahhar, Imam (1349)
al-Mahdi Ali bin Muhammad, Imam (1349–1372)
al-Nasir Muhammad Salah al-Din, Imam (1372–1391)
al-Mansur Ali bin Salah ad-Din, Imam (1391–1436)
al-Hadi Ali, Imam (1393–1432)

See also

Religious leaders by year

References

External links
 http://www.rulers.org/relig.html

14th century
 
Religious leaders